The 1970–71 season saw Rochdale compete for their second consecutive season in the Football League Third Division. The season also saw Rochdale win the Lancashire Cup for the first time since 1949.

Statistics
																												
																												

|}

Final League Table

Competitions

Football League Third Division

F.A. Cup

League Cup

Lancashire Cup

Rose Bowl

References

Rochdale A.F.C. seasons
Rochdale